Chipman is a civil parish in Queens County, New Brunswick, Canada.

For governance purposes it was divided (before 2023) between the village of Chipman and the local service district of the parish of Chipman, both of which were members of Regional Service Commission 11 (RSC11).

Origin of name
The parish was named for Ward Chipman Jr., Chief Justice of New Brunswick at the time of its erection.

History
Chipman was erected in 1835 from Brunswick and Canning Parishes.

In 1855 all of Chipman southeast of Coal Creek was transferred to Waterborough Parish.

In 1896 the boundary with Waterborough was altered, parallelling the Brunswick line from the mouth of North Branch Coal Creek to the county line; the lost territory became part of Waterborough.

Boundaries
Chipman Parish is bounded:

 on the northeast by the Kent County line;
 on the southeast by a line beginning on the county line at a point about 5.5 kilometres southeasterly of Route 116, then running southwesterly along a line parallel to the northwestern line of Brunswick Parish, which is a line running north 54º east from a point on the Saint John River about 1.8 kilometres southwest of the Route 715 bridge over McAlpines Brook, until striking Coal Creek at the southeast angle of a grant to Malcolm Carmichael upstream of the mouth of the South Branch Coal Creek, then down Coal Creek to the Northeast Arm of Grand Lake;
 on the southwest by a line running northwesterly from the Northeast Arm to Indian Point, then across Salmon Bay to strike land northeast of Newcastle Centre, then north 45º west past the Post Road and the old CPR line before turning nearly west and running about 400 metres to the Sunbury County line;
 on the northwest by the Sunbury County line.

Communities
Communities at least partly within the parish. bold indicates an incorporated municipality

 Briggs Corner
 Bronson
 Bronson Settlement
 Camp Wegesegum
 Castaway
  Chipman
 Coal Creek
 Dufferin
 Fowlers Corner
 Gaspereau Forks
 Harley Road
 Iron Bound Cove
 Kings Mines
 Midland
 Redbank
 Salmon Creek
 The Ridge
 Upper Gaspereau

Bodies of water
Bodies of water at least partly within the parish.

 Gaspereau River
 Salmon River
 Castaway Stream
 Iron Bound Cove Stream
 North Forks Stream
 Coal Creek
 Long Creek
 Redbank Creek
 Salmon Creek
  Grand Lake
 Northeast Arm
 Salmon Bay

Islands
Islands at least partly within the parish.
 Curley Island
 Long Island

Other notable places
Parks, historic sites, and other noteworthy places at least partly within the parish.
  Chipman Airport

Demographics
Parish population total does not include former incorporated village of Chipman. Revised census figures based on the 2023 local governance reforms have not been released.

Population
Population trend

Language
Mother tongue (2016)

Access Routes
Highways and numbered routes that run through the parish, including external routes that start or finish at the parish limits:

 Highways
 

 Principal Routes
 
 

 Secondary Routes:
 None

 External Routes:
 None

See also
 List of parishes in New Brunswick

Notes

References

Parishes of Queens County, New Brunswick
Local service districts of Queens County, New Brunswick